Woo In-hee (died 1981) was a North Korean actress and a mistress of Kim Jong-il.

Having reached stardom in the 1960s and 1970, Woo, renowned for her beauty, acted in dozens of films. She married Yoo Hosun, a famed film director, but she was involved in affairs outside of her marriage. In the late 1970s, she became a secret mistress of Kim Jong-il. After Woo began an affair with another man, Kim had her publicly executed in front of 6,000 people.

Early life
Woo In-hee was born in Kaesong. Though her exact date of birth remains unknown, it is believed to be in the late 1930s or early 1940s. She worked during the Korean War. Already a dancer, she was later taken to Pyongyang to become an actress. She was called the most beautiful woman in North Korea.

Career
After just one year in Pyongyang, Woo In-hee was given the main part in The Tale of Chunhyang, earning her instant stardom. She would go on to act in dozens of successful films. In The Girl from Diamond Mountain, for instance, Woo acted the role of a woman spanning her whole life from her youth to advanced age. Woo earned dozens of awards and had the prestigious title of  conferred upon her. Her feats attracted the personal interest and attention of Kim Jong-il. As a gesture of confidence, she was given an extraordinary permission to travel abroad to Czechoslovakia and study acting there. Woo's career flourished during the 1960s and 1970s.

Personal life

Marriage to Yoo Hosun
Upon returning from Czechoslovakia, Woo In-hee married Yoo Hosun, the most gifted director in the country. The couple had three sons. Woo, however, started affairs with various other men in the 1970s, which ruined her reputation. Her first extramarital relationship was with a member of a camera crew. Others were also people involved in the film industry. By the end of the 1970s, the rumors had spread to the point that her colleagues confronted her directly. They accused her of adultery during a mutual criticism session, but Woo reacted with defiance, pointing out that her accusers were in fact men who had begun affairs with her and thus adulterers themselves. Her career was ruined as she was stripped of her title of People's Actress and instead of acting was made to tend to the boiler of the film studio for a year, a dangerous job with 12-hour shifts. In 1979 she was suddenly allowed to return to acting, and was even given some lead roles.

Affair with Kim Jong-il
Woo In-hee started an affair with Kim Jong-il. It is not known for certain when they began their courtship, other than it took place sometime in the late 1970s. At the time, Unsung Heroes was being filmed and her husband Yoo Hosun acted in the film. It is possible that Kim and Woo had courted for years before Woo's fall from grace, or that her ruin made it possible for Kim to initiate a relationship in exchange for allowing her to return to acting. Kim had a fellow actor follow her around and report on her activities. The relationship was top secret and was being kept from everyone including Woo's husband Yoo Hosun.

After Kim, Woo fell in love with a young Zainichi Korean who had come to North Korea to work at a radio station. Woo met him and he overcame her initial reluctance. The couple could not meet in public, so they met driving around for hours in the man's Mercedes. In the winter of 1980, after such a joyride, they were found in the car suffering from carbon monoxide poisoning caused by the engine left running with windows shut to keep the cold out. The man had died and Woo had to spend two weeks at a hospital recovering. While interrogated over the death, she mentioned Kim Jong-il.

Execution
Kim Jong-il had Woo executed for talking about their secret relationship. In 1981, Woo was told she was free to go, but was instead taken to the Kang Kon Military Academy shooting grounds just north of Pyongyang. She was tied to a post and shot in front of 6,000 people.  Twelve gunmen each fired 10 rounds from their AK-47's, mutilating her body beyond recognition. Woo's husband Yoo Hosun was forced to watch the execution. Kim nullified Woo and Yoo's marriage and forced the latter to finish Unsung Heroes.

Woo's name and image were purged from magazines and film catalogs. She was edited out of films she had performed in, rendering their plots incomprehensible. Although the 6,000 witnesses to her execution were told not to talk about what they'd seen, the incident is widely known in North Korea. A South Korean TV drama, Until the Azalea Blooms, portrays her life. The show was banned in North Korea, but has nevertheless circulated in the country and people have been punished for watching it.

Filmography
The Story of a Detachment Commander
The Town where We Live
The Girl from Diamond Mountain

Other works
The Tale of Chunhyang

See also

Cinema of North Korea
List of North Korean actors

Notes

References

Works cited

Further reading

Year of birth missing
1981 deaths
20th-century executions by North Korea
Executed North Korean people
People executed by North Korea by firing squad
Kim dynasty (North Korea)
North Korean film actresses
20th-century North Korean actresses
People from Kaesong